is a trans-Neptunian object that is a member of the Haumea family.

Haumea family
As a member of the Haumea family,  is suspected of being an icy mantle collisional fragment from dwarf planet Haumea.  With an absolute magnitude (H) of 4.7, and a Haumea-family albedo of 0.7, this object would have a diameter of 158 km.

Observations by Mike Brown in 2012 using the W. M. Keck Observatory suggest that  does not have a companion.

References

External links 
 

Haumea family
Classical Kuiper belt objects
Discoveries by the Palomar Observatory
20050206